Zasphinctus is a genus of ants in the subfamily Dorylinae. The genus is a pantropical and distinctive group, originally described by Wheeler (1918) based on "Sphinctomyrmex" turneri collected in Queensland, Australia. Zasphinctus was first described as a subgenus of "Eusphinctus", and then synonymized into Sphinctomyrmex, to later be raised to full genus status by Borowiec (2016), who included approximately 20 species in the new genus circumscription.

Species

 Zasphinctus asper 
 Zasphinctus caledonicus 
 Zasphinctus cedaris 
 Zasphinctus chariensis 
 Zasphinctus clarus 
 Zasphinctus cribratus 
 Zasphinctus duchaussoyi 
 Zasphinctus emeryi 
 Zasphinctus froggatti 
 Zasphinctus imbecilis 
 Zasphinctus marcoyi 
 Zasphinctus mjobergi 
 Zasphinctus myops 
 Zasphinctus nigricans 
 Zasphinctus obamai 
 Zasphinctus occidentalis (
 Zasphinctus rufiventris 
 Zasphinctus sarowiwai 
 Zasphinctus septtrionalis 
 Zasphinctus siamensis 
 Zasphinctus steinheili 
 Zasphinctus trux 
 Zasphinctus turneri 
 Zasphinctus wilsoni

References

Dorylinae
Ant genera
Hymenoptera of Asia
Hymenoptera of Africa
Hymenoptera of Australia
Pantropical fauna